Cerastoderma glaucum, the lagoon cockle, is a species of saltwater clam, a marine bivalve mollusc in the family Cardiidae, the cockles.

This species is found along the coasts of Europe and North Africa, including the Mediterranean and Black Seas and the Caspian Sea, and the low-salinity Baltic Sea. It is a euryhaline species living in salinities 4-100 ‰. In north-west Europe (including the British Isles), it typically does not live on open shores but rather in shallow burrows in saline lagoons, or sometimes on lower shores in estuaries. It cannot tolerate significant exposure to the air. The form found in lagoons is thinner-shelled than the estuarine populations.

The lagoon cockle can grow to the length of 50 mm. In north-west Europe, it spawns in May–July, and the planktonic larval phase takes 11–30 days. The life span of the settled cockle is typically 2–5 years.

The species was described as Cardium glaucum in 1789 almost simultaneously both by Bruguière and by Poiret.

<div align=center>
Cerastoderma glaucum
Right and left valve of the same specimen:

</div align=center>

<div align=center>
Cerastoderma glaucum lamarcki
Right and left valve of the same specimen:

</div align=center>

References

External links

Cardiidae
Molluscs of the Atlantic Ocean
Molluscs of the Mediterranean Sea
Molluscs of the Black Sea
Marine molluscs of Europe
Molluscs of Europe
Marine molluscs of Africa
Marine molluscs of Asia
Bivalves of Asia
Bivalves described in 1789